James Leslie Starkey  (3 January 1895 – 10 January 1938) was a noted British archaeologist of the ancient Near East and Palestine in the period before the Second World War. He was the chief excavator of the first archaeological expedition to Lachish (Tell ed-Duweir) from 1932 to his death.

Starkey was robbed and killed near Bayt Jibrin on a track leading from Bayt Jibrin to Hebron. Issa Battat, a rebel commander from the ad-Dhahiriya area who led a rebel unit during the 1936–1939 Arab revolt in Palestine against the British, was held responsible by the British authorities for Starkey's killing. Battat was later killed in an ambush by British forces in May 1938. On the other hand, Yosef Garfinkel has suggested that the murder of Starkey had more to do with a dispute between the archaeologists, the government, and the Arab owners of the Lachish site. No agreement had been reached for access to the top of the mound and the government was in the process of compulsorily expropriating it.

Starkey is buried in Protestant Cemetery on Mount Zion, Jerusalem.

Footnotes

1895 births
1938 deaths
British archaeologists
Terrorism victims
Archaeologists of the Near East
Biblical archaeologists
Burials at Mount Zion (Protestant)
20th-century archaeologists
Terrorism deaths in Israel
1936–1939 Arab revolt in Palestine
1938 murders in Asia
Terrorist incidents in the 1930s
People murdered in Mandatory Palestine